Simran Bahadur (born 13 December 1999) is an Indian cricketer. In February 2021, Bahadur earned her maiden call-up to the India women's cricket team, for their limited overs matches against South Africa. She made her Women's Twenty20 International (WT20I) debut for India, against South Africa, on 20 March 2021.

In January 2022, she was named as one of three reserve players in India's team for the 2022 Women's Cricket World Cup in New Zealand. She made her Women's One Day International (WODI) debut on 15 February 2022, for India against New Zealand.

References

1999 births
Living people
Indian women cricketers
India women One Day International cricketers
India women Twenty20 International cricketers
Delhi women cricketers
IPL Velocity cricketers
Place of birth missing (living people)